Bechukotai, Bechukosai, or Bəḥuqothai (Biblical) ( bəḥuqqōṯay — Hebrew for "by my decrees," the second word, and the first distinctive word, in the parashah) is the 33rd weekly Torah portion (parashah) in the annual Jewish cycle of Torah reading and the 10th and last in the Book of Leviticus. It constitutes . The parashah addresses blessings for obeying the law, curses for disobeying it, and vows. The parashah is made up of 3,992 Hebrew letters, 1,013 Hebrew words, 78 verses, and 131 lines in a Torah Scroll (Sefer Torah).

Jews generally read it in May or early June. The lunisolar Hebrew calendar contains up to 55 weeks, the exact number varying between 50 in common years and 54 or 55 in leap years. In leap years (for example, 2022, 2024, and 2027), Parashat Bechukotai is read separately. In common years (for example, 2020, 2021, 2023, 2025, and 2026), Parashat Bechukotai is combined with the previous parashah, Behar, to help achieve the needed number of weekly readings.

In years when the first day of Passover falls on a Sabbath (as it does in 2022), Jews in Israel and Reform Jews read the parashah following Passover one week before Conservative and Orthodox Jews in the Diaspora. In such years, Jews in Israel and Reform Jews celebrate Passover for seven days and thus read the next parashah (in 2018, Shemini) on the Sabbath one week after the first day of Passover, while Conservative and Orthodox Jews in the Diaspora celebrate Passover for eight days and read the next parashah (in 2018, Shemini) one week later. In some such years (for example, 2018), the two calendars realign when Conservative and Orthodox Jews in the Diaspora read Behar together with Bechukotai while Jews in Israel and Reform Jews read them separately.

Readings

First reading — Leviticus 26:3–5
In the first reading (aliyah), God promises that if the Israelites follow God's laws, God will bless Israel with rains in their season, and abundant harvests.

Second reading — Leviticus 26:6–9
In the second reading (aliyah), God promises that if the Israelites follow God's laws, God would bless Israel with peace, victory over enemies, and fertility, and God's presence.

Third reading — Leviticus 26:10–46
In the third reading (aliyah), God promises that if the Israelites follow God's laws, God will bless Israel with God's presence. But in the section known as Tocheichah or the Admonitions, if the Israelites do not observe God's commandments, God will wreak upon Israel misery, consumption, fever, stolen harvests, defeat by enemies, poor harvests, attacks of wild beasts, pestilence, famine, desolation, and timidity. Those who survive will be removed to the land of their enemies, where they will become heartsick over their iniquity, confess their sin, and atone. God promises them that He will remember His covenant with Jacob, Isaac, Abraham, and the ancients whom God freed from Egypt.

Fourth reading — Leviticus 27:1–15
In the fourth reading (aliyah), God told Moses to instruct the Israelites that when anyone vows to offer God the value of a human being, the following scale would apply:
for a man from 20 to 60 years of age, 50 shekels of silver;
for a woman from 20 to 60 years, 30 shekels;
for a boy from 5 to 20 years, 20 shekels;
for a girl from 5 to 20 years, 10 shekels;
for a boy from 1 month to 5 years, 5 shekels;
for a girl from 1 month to 5 years, 3 shekels;
for a man 60 years or over, 15 shekels; and
for a woman 60 years or over, 10 shekels.
But if a vower could not afford the payment, the vower must appear before the priest, and the priest will assess the vower according to what the vower could afford. If the vow concerns an animal that could be brought as an offering, the animal is holy, and one can not exchange another for it, and if one does substitute one animal for another, the thing vowed and its substitute will both be holy. If the vow concerns an unclean animal that could not be brought as an offering, the vower is to present the animal to the priest, the priest is to assess it, and if the vower wishes to redeem it, the vower is to add one-fifth to its assessment. If one consecrates a house to God, the priest is to assess it, and if the vower wishes to redeem it, the vower is to add one-fifth to the assessment.

Fifth reading — Leviticus 27:16–21
In the fifth reading (aliyah), if one consecrates to God land of one's ancestral holding, the priest is to assess it in accordance with its seed requirement. If the vower consecrates the land after the jubilee year, the priest is to compute the price according to the years left until the next jubilee year, and reduce the assessment accordingly. If the vower wishes to redeem the land, the vower is to add one-fifth to the assessment and retain title, but if the vower does not redeem the land and the land is sold, it will no longer be redeemable, and at the jubilee the land is to become the priest's holding.

Sixth reading — Leviticus 27:22–28
In the sixth reading (aliyah), if one consecrates land that one purchased (not land of ancestral holding) the priest is to compute the assessment up to the jubilee year, the vower is to pay the assessment as of that day, and in the jubilee the land is to revert to the person whose ancestral holding the land was. No firstling of a clean animal could be consecrated, for it already belongs to God. But a firstling of an unclean animal should be redeemed at its assessment plus one-fifth, and if not redeemed, is to be sold at its assessment. Nothing that one had proscribed for God (subjected to cherem) could be sold or redeemed.

Seventh reading — Leviticus 27:29–34
In the seventh reading (aliyah), no human being proscribed could be ransomed, but he is to be put to death. All tithes from crops are to be God's, and if one wishes to redeem any of the tithes, the tither is to add one-fifth to them. Every tenth head of livestock is to be holy to God, and the owner is not to choose among good or bad when counting off the tithe.

Readings according to the triennial cycle
Jews who read the Torah according to the triennial cycle of Torah reading read the parashah according to a different schedule.

In inner-biblical interpretation
The parashah has parallels or is discussed in these Biblical sources:

Leviticus chapter 26
 addresses God's role in the creation of children.

The curses in Leviticus are considered more severe than those in Deuteronomy, for "the former [were] spoken by Moses in the name of God and the latter by Moses on his own initiative; the former is worded in first person and addressed to the Jews in plural while the latter is in first-person and addressed in singular form".

In , God promises to "remember" God's covenant with Jacob, Isaac, and Abraham to deliver the Israelites and the Land of Israel.

Leviticus chapter 27

In early nonrabbinic interpretation

The parashah has parallels or is discussed in these early nonrabbinic sources:

Leviticus chapter 27
Reading , Philo taught that in the case of those who vowed not merely property but their own selves, the law affixed a price to their vows, not having regard to the vower's beauty, importance, or anything of the kind, but treating each individual alike (separating men from women, and infants from the fully grown). Philo interpreted the law to set this price with equality for three reasons: (1) The importance of a vow is equal whether it was made by a person of great or of little importance. (2) Those who have made a vow should not be exposed to the treatment of slaves, who were valued according to the condition and beauty of their bodies. (3) Most importantly, while people value inequality, God honors equality.

In classical rabbinic interpretation
The parashah is discussed in these rabbinic sources from the era of the Mishnah and the Talmud:

Leviticus chapter 26
However, the Gemara reasoned that according to the opinion of Rabbi Ḥanina ben Gamliel, we need both of these clauses, as it might enter one's mind to say: If one follows God's statutes one will receive a blessing, whereas if one rejects God's statutes one will receive neither a blessing nor a curse. The verse therefore teaches us that the rejection of God's statutes warrants a curse.

The Sifra asked whether the words "If you walk in My statutes" in  might refer to observing religious duties. But the Sifra noted that the continuation of  says, "and keep My commandments, and do them," and that must cover observing religious duties. Thus the Sifra concluded that the words "If you walk in My statutes" must mean laboring in the Torah.

The Mishnah taught that they did not interrupt the reading of the curses, but had one person read them all.

The Mishnah taught that when (in the words of ) “the sword [went] through [the] land,” they would sound an alarm in all places, because it was a spreading evil.

A Baraita taught that several of the curses in  result from particular transgressions. The Baraita interpreted  to teach that as punishment for vain oaths, false oaths, desecration of God's Name, and desecration of the Sabbath, wild beasts multiply, domestic animals cease, population decreases, and roads become desolate. Using  to equate the word "covenant" with the Torah, the Baraita interpreted  to teach that as punishment for delaying judgment, perverting judgment, corrupting judgment, and neglecting Torah, sword and spoil increase, pestilence and famine come, people eat and are not satisfied, and people eat their scarce bread by weight. And the Baraita interpreted  to teach that as punishment for idolatry and failure to observe the Sabbatical (Shmita) and Jubilee (Yovel) years, the Jews are exiled and others come to dwell in their land.

Just as  attributes famine to sin, the Mishnah taught that a famine from drought comes when some of the people do not give tithes, a famine from tumult and drought comes when all decide not to give tithes, and a famine of annihilation comes when they decide (in addition) not to set apart the dough offering. Just as  attributes the sword to sin, the Mishnah taught that the sword comes to the world for the delay of justice, for the perversion of justice, and because of those who interpret the Torah counter to the accepted law. And just as  attributes pestilence to sin, the Mishnah taught that pestilence comes to the world for failure to execute judgment in capital crimes and for violation of the laws governing the produce of the Sabbatical year.

The Gemara concluded that all everyone is held responsible for each another. Thus the Gemara taught that all Jews stand as guarantors for one another.

The Gemara reconciled apparently discordant verses touching on vicarious responsibility. The Gemara noted that  states: "The fathers shall not be put to death for the children, neither shall the children be put to death for the fathers; every man shall be put to death for his own sin," but  (20:5 in NJPS) says: "visiting the iniquity of the fathers upon the children." The Gemara then questioned whether the words "they shall stumble one upon another" in  do not teach that one will stumble through the sin of the other, that all are held responsible for one another. The Gemara answered that the vicarious responsibility of which  speaks is limited to those who have the power to restrain their fellow from evil but do not do so.

In , the heart is humbled. A Midrash catalogued the wide range of additional capabilities of the heart reported in the Hebrew Bible. The heart speaks, sees, hears, walks, falls, stands, rejoices, cries, is comforted, is troubled, becomes hardened, grows faint, grieves, fears, can be broken, becomes proud, rebels, invents, cavils, overflows, devises, desires, goes astray, lusts, is refreshed, can be stolen, is enticed, errs, trembles, is awakened, loves, hates, envies, is searched, is rent, meditates, is like a fire, is like a stone, turns in repentance, becomes hot, dies, melts, takes in words, is susceptible to fear, gives thanks, covets, becomes hard, makes merry, acts deceitfully, speaks from out of itself, loves bribes, writes words, plans, receives commandments, acts with pride, makes arrangements, and aggrandizes itself.

The Tosefta noted that  reports that God said that God would remember God's covenants with Jacob, Isaac, and Abraham — in that order — while in every other place, Scripture gives precedence to Abraham over the other Patriarchs. The Tosefta concluded that this teaches that Scripture deems the three equivalent to each other.

Similarly, a Baraitha taught that God did "not reject" them in the days of the Chaldeans, for God sent them Daniel, Hananiah, Mishael, and Azariah, God did not "abhor them" in the days of the Greeks, for God sent them Simeon the Righteous, the Hasmonean and his sons, and Mattathias the High Priest, and God did not "destroy them utterly" in the days of Haman, for God sent them Mordecai and Esther, and God did not "break [God's] covenant with them" in the days of the Persians, for God sent them the house of Rabbi and the generations of Sages, "for [God will be] the Lord their God" in the time to come, when no nation or people will be able to subject them.

Leviticus chapter 27

When a girl turned 11 years old and throughout the year thereafter, they examined to determine whether she was aware of the significance of her vows. The vows of a girl 12 years old or older stood without examination. When a boy turned 12 years old and throughout the year thereafter, they examined to determine whether he was aware of the significance of his vows. The vows of a boy 13 years old or older stood without examination. For girls below age 11 or boys below age 12, even if they said that they knew in honor of Whose Name they vowed, their vows and dedications were not valid. After girls turned 12 or boys turned 13, even though they said that they did not know in the honor of Whose Name they vowed, their vows and dedications stood. The Sifri Zutta told that once a youth told Rabbi Akiva that the youth had dedicated a shovel. Rabbi Akiva asked the youth whether perhaps he had sanctified his shovel to the sun or the moon. The youth replied that Rabbi Akiva did not need to worry, as the youth had sanctified it to the One Who had created them. Rabbi Akiva told the youth that his vows were valid.

The Mishnah taught that the law of valuation sometimes tended toward leniency, and at other times tended toward stringency. The law valued equally the handsomest and the ugliest men in the country, either one owed 50 selas.

The Mishnah taught that to secure a vow to the Temple, they seized property from the one who made the vow. But they let the one who made the vow keep food for 30 days, garments for 12 months, bed and bedding, shoes, and tefillin. If the one who made the vow was a craftsperson, they left two of every kind of tool. If the one who made the vow was a carpenter, they left two axes and two saws. Rabbi Eliezer said that if the one who made the vow was a farmer, they left a yoke of oxen. If the one who made the vow was a donkey-driver, they left a donkey.

In response, the Gemara noted that Hezekiah said people say that an old man in the house is a burden, while an old woman in the house is a treasure.

Interpreting the instruction of  that "according to the means of him that vowed shall the priest value him," the Mishnah taught that this was done according to the ability of the one who vowed. The Mishnah taught that if a poor person vowed to give the value of a rich person, the poor person would pay only the valuation for a poor person. But if a rich person vowed to give the value of a poor person, the rich person still had to pay the full value of a rich person. Citing , the Gemara explained that the Merciful One made the obligation dependent upon the means of the one who vowed.

Jacob wished to ford the Jabbok and was detained there by an angel, who asked Jacob whether Jacob had not told God (in ), "Of all that you shall give me I will surely give a tenth to You." So Jacob gave a tenth of all the cattle that he had brought from Paddan Aram. Jacob had brought some 5,500 animals, so his tithe came to 550 animals. Jacob again tried to ford the Jabbok, but was hindered again. The angel once again asked Jacob whether Jacob had not told God (in ), "Of all that you shall give me I will surely give a tenth to You." The angel noted that Jacob had sons and that Jacob had not given a tithe of them. So Jacob set aside the four firstborn sons (whom the law excluded from the tithe) of each of the four mothers, and eight sons remained. He began to count from Simeon, and included Benjamin, and continued the count from the beginning. And so Levi was reckoned as the tenth son, and thus the tithe, holy to God, as  says, "The tenth shall be holy to the Lord." So the angel Michael descended and took Levi and brought him up before the Throne of Glory and told God that Levi was God's lot. And God blessed him, that the sons of Levi should minister on earth before God (as directed in ) like the ministering angels in Heaven.

In medieval Jewish interpretation
The parashah is discussed in these medieval Jewish sources:

Leviticus chapter 27
Maimonides considered the law concerning the exchange of a sacrifice as preventive, for if it were permitted to substitute a good animal for a bad one, people would substitute a bad animal for a good one, and say that it was better than the original. Thus,  sets forth the rule that if any such change took place, both the "original sacrifice and the exchange thereof should be holy." And Maimonides explained that the reason for the rule of  that when a person redeemed a thing devoted to the Sanctuary, the person needed to add one fifth, was because people are usually selfish and naturally inclined to keep and save their property. The owner would therefore not take the necessary trouble in the interest of the Sanctuary, and would not expose the property sufficiently to the valuer, and its true value would not be fixed. Therefore, the owner had to add one-fifth. Maimonides taught that these rules were laid down in order that people should not despise what was connected to the name of God, and which served as a means of approaching God.

In modern interpretation
The parashah is discussed in these modern sources:

Leviticus chapter 27
The British anthropologist Mary Douglas noted that while chapter 25 deals with person-to-person obligations, the release of slaves, their return to their homes, redemption of property, remission of secular debts, chapter 27 deals with the same topics from the point of view of debts to God. In , God respected the jubilee law. God, as a creditor, came under the power of the jubilee laws. God proved God's generosity by telling Moses the conditions under which persons, animals, or chattels that had been dedicated to God's service could be redeemed. Douglas also taught that chapter 27 serves a rhetorical function. Douglas saw in chapter 27 a ring composition in which the end of Leviticus returns to its beginning. Noting that Leviticus starts with the meats reserved for the priests at a sacrifice, Douglas pointed out that at the end, Leviticus is largely about consecrated things and the things that belong to God: blood, the priests, the land, and dedicated animals.

 reports that a shekel equals 20 gerahs. This table translates units of weight used in the Bible:

Commandments
According to Sefer ha-Chinuch, there are 7 positive and 5 negative commandments in the parashah:
When one vows a person's value, to estimate the value as determined by the Torah
Not to substitute another beast for one set apart for sacrifice
The new animal, in addition to the substituted one, retains consecration.
To estimate the value of consecrated animals
To estimate the value of consecrated houses

To estimate the value of consecrated fields
Not to change consecrated animals from one type of offering to another
To carry out the laws of interdicting possessions
Not to sell interdicted possessions
Not to redeem interdicted possessions
To separate the tithe from animals every year
Not to redeem the tithe

Haftarah

Further reading
The parashah has parallels or is discussed in these sources:

Ancient
Vassal treaties of Esarhaddon

Biblical
 (blessings and curses).
 (cannibalism).
 (cannibalism).
 (parents eating children).
 (parents eating children);  (sword, famine, pestilence, destroy high places, bring the sword against, cast slain men before idols, make the land desolate, make cities a waste, the savor).
 (abundant harvests).
 (cannibalism).
 (mothers eating children).

Early nonrabbinic
Josephus. The Wars of the Jews, 6:3:3–5. Circa 75 CE. In, e.g., The Works of Josephus: Complete and Unabridged, New Updated Edition. Translated by William Whiston, pages 737–38. Peabody, Massachusetts: Hendrickson Publishers, 1987. .

Classical rabbinic
Mishnah: Challah 4:9; Taanit 3:5; Megillah 3:3, 6; Chagigah 1:4; Avot 5:8; Menachot 9:7, 12:1; Bekhorot 1:7, 9:1–8; Arakhin 1:1–9:8; Temurah 1:1–7:6. Land of Israel, circa 200 CE. In, e.g., The Mishnah: A New Translation. Translated by Jacob Neusner, pages 157, 312, 320–21, 329, 752, 759, 790, 807–36. New Haven: Yale University Press, 1988. .
Tosefta: Terumot 3:16; Challah 2:8–10; Rosh Hashanah 2:2; Megillah 3:9; Makkot 5:5, 10; Arakhin 1:1–5:19; Temurah 1:1–4:17; Keritot 4:15. Land of Israel, circa 250 CE. In, e.g., The Tosefta: Translated from the Hebrew, with a New Introduction. Translated by Jacob Neusner (Peabody, Massachusetts: Hendrickson Publishers, 2002), volume 1, pages 149, 339, 611, 646; volume 2, pages 1215–16, 1495–535, 1570.
Sifra 260:1–277:1. Land of Israel, 4th Century CE. In, e.g., Sifra: An Analytical Translation. Translated by Jacob Neusner, volume 3, pages 345–409. Atlanta: Scholars Press, 1988. .
Jerusalem Talmud: Berakhot 90b; Peah 8a, 64a; Maasrot 1a; Maaser Sheni 4a, 24a, 31b, 37b, 48a, 50a; Challah 15b, 31b, 46b; Shabbat 88b; Rosh Hashanah 4b; Taanit 4b; Megillah 8a, 30a; Yevamot 10b; Nedarim 1a; Nazir 1a, 6b, 16b, 23b; Kiddushin 7b, 19a; Bava Metzia 16a; Sanhedrin 37b, 39a, 62a. Tiberias, Land of Israel, circa 400 CE. In, e.g., Talmud Yerushalmi. Edited by Chaim Malinowitz, Yisroel Simcha Schorr, and Mordechai Marcus, volumes 2–3, 9–11, 15, 24, 25–26, 29, 33–34, 40, 42, 45. Brooklyn: Mesorah Publications, 2006–2018. And reprinted in, e.g., The Jerusalem Talmud: A Translation and Commentary. Edited by Jacob Neusner and translated by Jacob Neusner, Tzvee Zahavy, B. Barry Levy, and Edward Goldman. Peabody, Massachusetts: Hendrickson Publishers, 2009. .
Genesis Rabbah 1:15; 4:5; 6:5; 12:2, 6; 13:15; 56:9; 66:2. Land of Israel, 5th century. In, e.g., Midrash Rabbah: Genesis. Translated by Harry Freedman and Maurice Simon, volume 1, pages 13–14, 30, 44, 88–89, 91–93, 108–09, 498–99; volume 2, 601. London: Soncino Press, 1939. .
Leviticus Rabbah 6:5, 10:7, 11:3, 15:1, 34:9, 35:1–37:4. Land of Israel, 5th Century. In, e.g., Midrash Rabbah: Leviticus. Translated by Harry Freedman and Maurice Simon, volume 4, pages 84, 131, 137, 189, 435, 446–71. London: Soncino Press, 1939. .

Babylonian Talmud: Berakhot 47b; Shabbat 32b–33a, 77b, 104a, 136b, 148b; Eruvin 2a, 31b, 50a; Pesachim 37b, 63a, 66b; Yoma 50b, 66a, 80a; Beitzah 36b; Rosh Hashanah 2a, 4a; Taanit 7b, 22b; Megillah 2b, 11a, 23b, 25b, 28a, 31a–b; Chagigah 10a; Yevamot 20a, 84a; Ketubot 37b, 46a, 54a; Nedarim 18b, 20a, 36b, 69b; Nazir 25a, 31a–b, 61a, 62a; Gittin 12a, 37a, 38b, 48a; Kiddushin 5a, 7a, 17a, 24a, 29a, 32a, 53a, 54b, 61a–b; Bava Kamma 10a, 13a, 40a, 68b, 69b, 73b, 78a, 102b, 109b, 110b, 115b; Bava Metzia 6a, 7a, 46a, 47a, 53b–55a, 57a, 67b, 91a, 106a, 113b; Bava Batra 71a, 72a–b, 75a, 88b, 91b, 103a, 108b, 112a, 121b; Sanhedrin 14b–15a, 27b, 52b, 63b, 70a, 87a, 88a, 100a; Makkot 13a–b, 16a, 19a, 21b, 22b, 24a; Shevuot 11b, 16b, 21a, 22a, 39a; Avodah Zarah 5a, 13a, 63a; Zevachim 5b–6a, 9a, 12a, 30a, 56b, 81b; Menachot 6a, 79b, 81a, 82a, 87b, 92a, 93a, 101a; Chullin 2a, 25b, 30a, 41b, 69a–b, 84a, 114a, 130a, 133b, 135a, 136b, 139a; Bekhorot 4b, 10b–11a, 12a, 13a, 14a–b, 15b, 31b–32b, 36b, 37b, 41b–42a, 49a, 50a–b, 51b, 53a–b, 54b, 57a, 58b, 59b–60b; Arakhin 2a–34a; Temurah 2a–34a; Keritot 27a; Meilah 10b, 13a; Niddah 4b; 28b; 48a. Sasanian Empire, 6th Century. In, e.g., Talmud Bavli. Edited by Yisroel Simcha Schorr, Chaim Malinowitz, and Mordechai Marcus, 72 volumes. Brooklyn: Mesorah Pubs., 2006.
Tanhuma Bechukotai. 6th–7th Century. In, e.g., Metsudah Midrash Tanchuma: Vayikra. Translated and annotated by Avraham Davis, edited by Yaakov Y.H. Pupko, volume 5, pages 531–58. Monsey, New York: Eastern Book Press, 2006.

Medieval
Tanna Devei Eliyahu. Seder Eliyyahu Rabbah 16, 56, 95–96, 130–31. Eliyyahu Zuta 171. 10th Century. In, e.g., Tanna Debe Eliyyahu: The Lore of the School of Elijah. Translated by William G. Braude and Israel J. Kapstein, pages 34, 129, 212, 283, 365. Philadelphia: Jewish Publication Society, 1981. .
Solomon ibn Gabirol. A Crown for the King, 24:284. Spain, 11th Century. Translated by David R. Slavitt, pages 38–39. New York: Oxford University Press, 1998. .

Rashi. Commentary. Leviticus 26–27. Troyes, France, late 11th Century. In, e.g., Rashi. The Torah: With Rashi's Commentary Translated, Annotated, and Elucidated. Translated and annotated by Yisrael Isser Zvi Herczeg, volume 3, pages 347–86. Brooklyn: Mesorah Publications, 1994. .
Rashbam. Commentary on the Torah. Troyes, early 12th century. In, e.g., Rashbam's Commentary on Leviticus and Numbers: An Annotated Translation. Edited and translated by Martin I. Lockshin, pages 139–54. Providence: Brown Judaic Studies, 2001. .
Abraham ibn Ezra. Commentary on the Torah. Mid-12th century. In, e.g., Ibn Ezra's Commentary on the Pentateuch: Leviticus (Va-yikra). Translated and annotated by H. Norman Strickman and Arthur M. Silver, volume 3, pages 261–87. New York: Menorah Publishing Company, 2004. .

Maimonides. The Guide for the Perplexed, part 1, chapter 30; part 3, chapters 17, 32, 35, 36, 37, 41, 46, 51. Cairo, Egypt, 1190. In, e.g., Moses Maimonides. The Guide for the Perplexed. Translated by Michael Friedländer, pages 39, 287, 326, 329, 331–32, 334, 346, 360–61, 388. New York: Dover Publications, 1956. .
Bahir, part 1, paragraphs 67, 103. Provence, circa 1174. In, e.g., The Bahir: A Translation and Commentary. Translation and commentary by Aryeh Kaplan, pages 24, 38. Lanham, Maryland: Jason Aronson, 1977. .
Hezekiah ben Manoah. Hizkuni. France, circa 1240. In, e.g., Chizkiyahu ben Manoach. Chizkuni: Torah Commentary. Translated and annotated by Eliyahu Munk, volume 3, pages 830–46. Jerusalem: Ktav Publishers, 2013. .
Naḥmanides. Commentary on the Torah. Jerusalem, circa 1270. In, e.g., Ramban (Nachmanides): Commentary on the Torah. Translated by Charles B. Chavel, volume 3, pages 455–83. New York: Shilo Publishing House, 1974. .
Zohar 3:112a–115b. Spain, late 13th Century. In, e.g., The Zohar. Translated by Harry Sperling and Maurice Simon. 5 volumes. London: Soncino Press, 1934.
Bahya ben Asher. Commentary on the Torah. Spain, early 14th century. In, e.g., Midrash Rabbeinu Bachya: Torah Commentary by Rabbi Bachya ben Asher. Translated and annotated by Eliyahu Munk, volume 5, pages 1845–77. Jerusalem: Lambda Publishers, 2003. .
Jacob ben Asher (Baal Ha-Turim). Rimze Ba'al ha-Turim. Early 14th century. In, e.g., Baal Haturim Chumash: Vayikra/Leviticus. Translated by Eliyahu Touger, edited, elucidated, and annotated by Avie Gold, volume 3, pages 1295–318. Brooklyn: Mesorah Publications, 2000. .
Jacob ben Asher. Perush Al ha-Torah. Early 14th century. In, e.g., Yaakov ben Asher. Tur on the Torah. Translated and annotated by Eliyahu Munk, volume 3, pages 986–1003. Jerusalem: Lambda Publishers, 2005. .
Isaac ben Moses Arama. Akedat Yizhak (The Binding of Isaac). Late 15th century. In, e.g., Yitzchak Arama. Akeydat Yitzchak: Commentary of Rabbi Yitzchak Arama on the Torah. Translated and condensed by Eliyahu Munk, volume 2, pages 673–83. New York, Lambda Publishers, 2001. .

Modern
Isaac Abravanel. Commentary on the Torah. Italy, between 1492 and 1509. In, e.g., Abarbanel: Selected Commentaries on the Torah: Volume 3: Vayikra/Leviticus. Translated and annotated by Israel Lazar, pages 253–301. Brooklyn: CreateSpace, 2015. .
Obadiah ben Jacob Sforno. Commentary on the Torah. Venice, 1567. In, e.g., Sforno: Commentary on the Torah. Translation and explanatory notes by Raphael Pelcovitz, pages 626–37. Brooklyn: Mesorah Publications, 1997. .
Moshe Alshich. Commentary on the Torah. Safed, circa 1593. In, e.g., Moshe Alshich. Midrash of Rabbi Moshe Alshich on the Torah. Translated and annotated by Eliyahu Munk, volume 2, pages 772–90. New York, Lambda Publishers, 2000. .
Avraham Yehoshua Heschel. Commentaries on the Torah. Cracow, Poland, mid 17th century. Compiled as Chanukat HaTorah. Edited by Chanoch Henoch Erzohn. Piotrkow, Poland, 1900. In Avraham Yehoshua Heschel. Chanukas HaTorah: Mystical Insights of Rav Avraham Yehoshua Heschel on Chumash. Translated by Avraham Peretz Friedman, pages 238–40. Southfield, Michigan: Targum Press/Feldheim Publishers, 2004. .

Thomas Hobbes. Leviathan, 3:40. England, 1651. Reprint edited by C. B. Macpherson, pages 503–04. Harmondsworth, England: Penguin Classics, 1982. .
Shabbethai Bass. Sifsei Chachamim. Amsterdam, 1680. In, e.g., Sefer Vayikro: From the Five Books of the Torah: Chumash: Targum Okelos: Rashi: Sifsei Chachamim: Yalkut: Haftaros, translated by Avrohom Y. Davis, pages 530–87. Lakewood Township, New Jersey: Metsudah Publications, 2012.
Chaim ibn Attar. Ohr ha-Chaim. Venice, 1742. In Chayim ben Attar. Or Hachayim: Commentary on the Torah. Translated by Eliyahu Munk, volume 3, pages 1291–346. Brooklyn: Lambda Publishers, 1999. .
Nachman of Breslov. Teachings. Bratslav, Ukraine, before 1811. In Rebbe Nachman's Torah: Breslov Insights into the Weekly Torah Reading: Exodus-Leviticus. Compiled by Chaim Kramer, edited by Y. Hall, pages 426–37. Jerusalem: Breslov Research Institute, 2011. .

Samuel David Luzzatto (Shadal). Commentary on the Torah. Padua, 1871. In, e.g., Samuel David Luzzatto. Torah Commentary. Translated and annotated by Eliyahu Munk, volume 3, pages 993–1003. New York: Lambda Publishers, 2012. .
Yehudah Aryeh Leib Alter. Sefat Emet. Góra Kalwaria (Ger), Poland, before 1906. Excerpted in The Language of Truth: The Torah Commentary of Sefat Emet. Translated and interpreted by Arthur Green, pages 209–15. Philadelphia: Jewish Publication Society, 1998. . Reprinted 2012. .
Alexander Alan Steinbach. Sabbath Queen: Fifty-four Bible Talks to the Young Based on Each Portion of the Pentateuch, pages 103–06. New York: Behrman's Jewish Book House, 1936.
Isaac Mendelsohn. Slavery in the Ancient Near East, pages 117ff. New York: Oxford University Press, 1949.
Gordon J. Wenham. "Leviticus 27:2–8 and the Price of Slaves." Zeitschrift für die Alttestamentliche Wissenschaft, volume 90 (1978): pages 264–65.
Gordon J. Wenham. The Book of Leviticus, pages 324–43. Grand Rapids, Michigan: William B. Eerdmans Publishing Company, 1979. .
Lionel E. Moses. "Is There an Authentic Triennial Cycle of Torah Readings?" New York: Rabbinical Assembly, 1987. OH 137.1987b. In Responsa: 1980–1990: The Committee on Jewish Law and Standards of the Conservative Movement. Edited by David J. Fine, pages 77, 90. New York: Rabbinical Assembly, 2005. . (implications of an injunction to read the curses before the end of Passover for a triennial Torah reading cycle).
Avram Israel Reisner. "A Halakhic Ethic of Care for the Terminally Ill." New York: Rabbinical Assembly, 1990. YD 339:1.1990a. In Responsa: 1980–1990: The Committee on Jewish Law and Standards of the Conservative Movement. Edited by David J. Fine, pages 467, 477, 497 n. 32. New York: Rabbinical Assembly, 2005. . (God's role in illness and healing, and the implications for our duty to seek medical care).
Pinchas H. Peli. Torah Today: A Renewed Encounter with Scripture, pages 151–54. Washington, D.C.: B'nai B'rith Books, 1987. .
Mark S. Smith. The Early History of God: Yahweh and the Other Deities in Ancient Israel, page 100. New York: HarperSanFrancisco, 1990. .
Harvey J. Fields. A Torah Commentary for Our Times: Volume II: Exodus and Leviticus, pages 150–61. New York: UAHC Press, 1991. .
Walter C. Kaiser Jr., "The Book of Leviticus," in The New Interpreter's Bible, volume 1, pages 1175–91. Nashville: Abingdon Press, 1994. .
Judith S. Antonelli. "Mother Nature." In In the Image of God: A Feminist Commentary on the Torah, pages 322–28. Northvale, New Jersey: Jason Aronson, 1995. .
Ellen Frankel. The Five Books of Miriam: A Woman's Commentary on the Torah, pages 191–93. New York: G. P. Putnam's Sons, 1996. .

W. Gunther Plaut. The Haftarah Commentary, pages 318–26. New York: UAHC Press, 1996. .
Sorel Goldberg Loeb and Barbara Binder Kadden. Teaching Torah: A Treasury of Insights and Activities, pages 220–25. Denver: A.R.E. Publishing, 1997. .
Elliot N. Dorff and Aaron L. Mackler. "Responsibilities for the Provision of Health Care." New York: Rabbinical Assembly, 1998. YD 336:1.1998. In Responsa: 1991–2000: The Committee on Jewish Law and Standards of the Conservative Movement. Edited by Kassel Abelson and David J. Fine, pages 319, 321 note 2. New York: Rabbinical Assembly, 2002. . (God's role in illness and healing, and the implications for our duty to provide medical care).
Elizabeth Bolton. "Mir Zaynen Do — We Are Here." In The Women's Torah Commentary: New Insights from Women Rabbis on the 54 Weekly Torah Portions. Edited by Elyse Goldstein, pages 246–52. Woodstock, Vermont: Jewish Lights Publishing, 2000. .
Frank H. Gorman Jr. “Leviticus.” In The HarperCollins Bible Commentary. Edited by James L. Mays, pages 164–65. New York: HarperCollins Publishers, revised edition, 2000. .
Lainie Blum Cogan and Judy Weiss. Teaching Haftarah: Background, Insights, and Strategies, pages 396–401. Denver: A.R.E. Publishing, 2002. .
Michael Fishbane. The JPS Bible Commentary: Haftarot, pages 203–09. Philadelphia: Jewish Publication Society, 2002. .
Robert Alter. The Five Books of Moses: A Translation with Commentary, pages 660–72. New York: W.W. Norton & Co., 2004. .
Jacob Milgrom. Leviticus: A Book of Ritual and Ethics: A Continental Commentary, pages 317–33. Minneapolis: Fortress Press, 2004. .
Baruch J. Schwartz. "Leviticus." In The Jewish Study Bible. Edited by Adele Berlin and Marc Zvi Brettler, pages 273–80. New York: Oxford University Press, 2004. .
Hanna Gracia Yerushalmi. "Haftarat Bechukotai: Jeremiah 16:19–17:14." In The Women's Haftarah Commentary: New Insights from Women Rabbis on the 54 Weekly Haftarah Portions, the 5 Megillot & Special Shabbatot. Edited by Elyse Goldstein, pages 151–58. Woodstock, Vermont: Jewish Lights Publishing, 2004. .
Antony Cothey. “Ethics and Holiness in the Theology of Leviticus.” Journal for the Study of the Old Testament, volume 30 (number 2) (December 2005): pages 131–51.
Professors on the Parashah: Studies on the Weekly Torah Reading Edited by Leib Moscovitz, pages 225–30. Jerusalem: Urim Publications, 2005. .
Calum Carmichael. Illuminating Leviticus: A Study of Its Laws and Institutions in the Light of Biblical Narratives. Baltimore: Johns Hopkins University Press, 2006. .
Bernard J. Bamberger. “Leviticus.” In The Torah: A Modern Commentary: Revised Edition. Edited by W. Gunther Plaut; revised edition edited by David E.S. Stern, The Torah: A Modern Commentary: Revised Edition. Revised edition edited by David E.S. Stern, pages 864–82. New York: Union for Reform Judaism, 2006. .
Esther Jungreis. Life Is a Test, page 224. Brooklyn: Shaar Press, 2007. .

James L. Kugel. How To Read the Bible: A Guide to Scripture, Then and Now, pages 291, 302, 346–49, 609–10. New York: Free Press, 2007. .
Christophe Nihan. From Priestly Torah to Pentateuch: A Study in the Composition of the Book of Leviticus. Coronet Books, 2007. .
Tamara Cohn Eskenazi and Andrea L. Weiss, editors. The Torah: A Women's Commentary, pages 765–86. New York: URJ Press, 2008. .
Ted D. Manby. “An Exegetical Study of Leviticus 26: Mosaic Covenantal Laws, Blessings, and Curses with Implications for the Reading of Old Testament Canonical Books.” Master's thesis, Southeastern Baptist Theological Seminary, 2008.
Roy E. Gane. "Leviticus." In Zondervan Illustrated Bible Backgrounds Commentary. Edited by John H. Walton, volume 1, pages 323–26. Grand Rapids, Michigan: Zondervan, 2009. .
Reuven Hammer. Entering Torah: Prefaces to the Weekly Torah Portion, pages 189–92. New York: Gefen Publishing House, 2009. .
Sarah Pessin. “‘Less Is More’ and the Gift of Rain: The Value of Devaluation in Behukotai and Cixous's Desire-That-Gives: Parashat Behukotai (Leviticus 26:3–27:34).” In Torah Queeries: Weekly Commentaries on the Hebrew Bible. Edited by Gregg Drinkwater, Joshua Lesser, and David Shneer; foreword by Judith Plaskow, pages 179–83. New York: New York University Press, 2009. .
Stuart Lasine. “Everything Belongs to Me: Holiness, Danger, and Divine Kingship in the Post-Genesis World.” Journal for the Study of the Old Testament, volume 35 (number 1) (September 2010): pages 31–62.
Jeffrey Stackert. “Leviticus.” In The New Oxford Annotated Bible: New Revised Standard Version with the Apocrypha: An Ecumenical Study Bible. Edited by Michael D. Coogan, Marc Z. Brettler, Carol A. Newsom, and Pheme Perkins, pages 180–83. New York: Oxford University Press, Revised 4th Edition 2010. .

William G. Dever. The Lives of Ordinary People in Ancient Israel: When Archaeology and the Bible Intersect, pages 188, 244, 291. Grand Rapids, Michigan: William B. Eerdmans Publishing Company, 2012. .
Shmuel Herzfeld. "If You Want To Sleep at Night, Give Away Your Pillow." In Fifty-Four Pick Up: Fifteen-Minute Inspirational Torah Lessons, pages 184–89. Jerusalem: Gefen Publishing House, 2012. .

Jonathan Sacks. Covenant & Conversation: A Weekly Reading of the Jewish Bible: Leviticus: The Book of Holiness, pages 401–33. Jerusalem: Maggid Books, 2015. .
Jonathan Sacks. Lessons in Leadership: A Weekly Reading of the Jewish Bible, pages 175–80. New Milford, Connecticut: Maggid Books, 2015. .
Jonathan Sacks. Essays on Ethics: A Weekly Reading of the Jewish Bible, pages 207–11. New Milford, Connecticut: Maggid Books, 2016. .
Shai Held. The Heart of Torah, Volume 2: Essays on the Weekly Torah Portion: Leviticus, Numbers, and Deuteronomy, pages 81–89. Philadelphia: Jewish Publication Society, 2017. .
Steven Levy and Sarah Levy. The JPS Rashi Discussion Torah Commentary, pages 106–09. Philadelphia: Jewish Publication Society, 2017. .

External links

References

Texts
Masoretic text and 1917 JPS translation
Hear the parashah chanted 
Hear the parashah read in Hebrew

Commentaries

Academy for Jewish Religion, New York
Aish.com 
Akhlah: The Jewish Children's Learning Network
Aleph Beta Academy
American Jewish University — Ziegler School of Rabbinic Studies
Anshe Emes Synagogue, Los Angeles 
Ari Goldwag
Ascent of Safed
Bar-Ilan University
Chabad.org
eparsha.com
G-dcast
The Israel Koschitzky Virtual Beit Midrash
Jewish Agency for Israel
Jewish Theological Seminary
Kabbala Online
LearningTorah.org
Mechon Hadar
Miriam Aflalo
MyJewishLearning.com
Ohr Sameach
Orthodox Union
OzTorah, Torah from Australia
Oz Ve Shalom — Netivot Shalom
Pardes from Jerusalem
Professor James L. Kugel
Professor Michael Carasik
Rabbi Dov Linzer
Rabbi Fabian Werbin
Rabbi Jonathan Sacks
RabbiShimon.com 
Rabbi Shlomo Riskin
Rabbi Shmuel Herzfeld
Rabbi Stan Levin
Reconstructionist Judaism 
Sephardic Institute
Shiur.com
613.org Jewish Torah Audio
Tanach Study Center
Teach613.org, Torah Education at Cherry Hill
TheTorah.com
Torah Downloads
Torah from Dixie 
Torah.org
TorahVort
Union for Reform Judaism
United Synagogue of Conservative Judaism
What's Bothering Rashi?
Yeshivat Chovevei Torah
Yeshiva University

Weekly Torah readings in Iyar
Weekly Torah readings from Leviticus
Hebrew words and phrases in the Hebrew Bible